KBLP (105.1 FM, "Oklahoma Country 105") is a radio station broadcasting a country music format. Licensed to Lindsay, Oklahoma, United States, the station is currently owned by Jason Wollenberg and Kevin Scruggs, through licensee KBLP Partners, LLC, and features programming from Citadel Media.

History
The Federal Communications Commission issued a construction permit for the station on January 12, 1988. The station was assigned the KBLP call sign on February 10, 1988, and received its license to cover on June 26, 1989.

References

External links

BLP
Radio stations established in 1989
Country radio stations in the United States
1989 establishments in Oklahoma